The Theft Act (Northern Ireland) 1969 (c 16) is an Act of the Parliament of Northern Ireland. It makes criminal law provisions for Northern Ireland similar to those made in England and Wales by the Theft Act 1968.

Section 1 - Theft
This section creates the offence of theft.

Section 8 - Robbery
This section creates the offence of robbery.

Section 9 - Burglary
This section creates the offence of burglary.

Section 10 - Aggravated burglary
This section creates the offence of aggravated burglary.

Section 11 - Removal of articles from places open to the public
This section creates the offence of removing article from place open to the public.

Section 13 - Abstracting of electricity
This section creates the offence of abstracting electricity.

Section 15 - Obtaining property by deception
This section is repealed. It created the offence of obtaining property by deception.

Section 15A - Obtaining a money transfer by deception
This section is repealed. It created the offence of obtaining a money transfer by deception.

Section 16 - Obtaining pecuniary advantage by deception
This section is repealed. It created the offence of obtaining pecuniary advantage by deception.

Section 17 - False accounting
This section creates an offence of false accounting.

Section 20 - Blackmail
This section creates the offence of blackmail.

Section 21 -Handling stolen goods
This section creates the offence of handling stolen goods.

See also
Theft Act

References

External links
The Theft Act (Northern Ireland) 1969, as amended from the National Archives.

Acts of the Parliament of Northern Ireland 1969